Joe Dahl (born April 9, 1993) is an American football guard who is a free agent. He played college football at Washington State. He was drafted by the Detroit Lions in the fifth round of the 2016 NFL Draft.

College career
After graduating from University High School and spending one year at the University of Montana and another sitting out as a transfer student, Dahl stepped into the starting lineup for Washington State and stayed there for the next three years. He started at left guard in 2013 before moving out to left tackle for their bowl game. He stayed at left tackle the next two seasons. He earned first-team All-Pac-12 and USA Today second-team All-American accolades at left tackle in 2015.

Professional career

Dahl was drafted by the Detroit Lions in the fifth round, 151st overall, of the 2016 NFL Draft.

In his rookie season, he played in six games.

On September 26, 2017, Dahl was placed on injured reserve with a leg injury. He was activated off injured reserve to the active roster on December 9, 2017.

On August 6, 2019, Dahl signed a two-year contract extension with the Lions. He was named the Lions starting left guard to begin the season. He started the first 13 games before being placed on injured reserve on December 14, 2019.

On September 19, 2020, Dahl was placed on injured reserve. He was activated on October 17. He was released after the season with a "failed physical" designation on March 15, 2021.

References

External links
 Washington State Cougars bio

1993 births
American football offensive linemen
Detroit Lions players
Living people
Players of American football from Spokane, Washington
Washington State Cougars football players
Montana Grizzlies football players